The 1952 United States House of Representatives elections in South Carolina were held on November 4, 1952 to select six Representatives for two-year terms from the state of South Carolina.  All six incumbents were re-elected and the composition of the state delegation remained solely Democratic.

1st congressional district
Incumbent Democratic Congressman L. Mendel Rivers of the 1st congressional district, in office since 1941, was unopposed in his bid for re-election.

General election results

|-
| 
| colspan=5 |Democratic hold
|-

2nd congressional district
Incumbent Democratic Congressman John J. Riley of the 2nd congressional district, in office since 1951, was unopposed in his bid for re-election.

General election results

|-
| 
| colspan=5 |Democratic hold
|-

3rd congressional district
Incumbent Democratic Congressman W.J. Bryan Dorn of the 3rd congressional district, in office since 1951, defeated Republican challenger David Dows.

General election results

|-
| 
| colspan=5 |Democratic hold
|-

4th congressional district
Incumbent Democratic Congressman Joseph R. Bryson of the 4th congressional district, in office since 1939, was unopposed in his bid for re-election.

General election results

|-
| 
| colspan=5 |Democratic hold
|-

5th congressional district
Incumbent Democratic Congressman James P. Richards of the 5th congressional district, in office since 1933, defeated Wade S. Weatherford in the Democratic primary and Republican Herbert L. Crosland in the general election.

Democratic primary

General election results

|-
| 
| colspan=5 |Democratic hold
|-

6th congressional district
Incumbent Democratic Congressman John L. McMillan of the 6th congressional district, in office since 1939, was unopposed in his bid for re-election.

General election results

|-
| 
| colspan=5 |Democratic hold
|-

See also
United States House of Representatives elections, 1952
South Carolina's congressional districts

References

"Supplemental Report of the Secretary of State to the General Assembly of South Carolina." Reports and Resolutions of South Carolina to the General Assembly of the State of South Carolina. Volume I. Columbia, SC: 1949, pp. 9–11.

South Carolina
United States House of Representatives
1952